Donald Donoher (born January 21, 1932) is an American retired college basketball coach and athletics administrator.  He served as the head men's basketball coach at the University of Dayton from 1964 to 1989, compiling a record of 437–275.  His Dayton Flyers were champions of the 1968 National Invitation Tournament and runners-up at the 1967 NCAA University Division basketball tournament.  Donoher was also the athletic director at Dayton from 1976 to 1980.

Early years
Donoher began his career as a basketball player at Central Catholic High School in Toledo, Ohio from 1947 to 1950.  He played three years of varsity basketball for coach Tom Blackburn at the University of Dayton, scoring 578 career points in 72 games.  Following graduation from Dayton in 1954, Donoher served a two-year enlistment in the United States Army.  Returning to Dayton after the end of his service, Donoher accepted a part-time basketball scout position offered by Blackburn.  In February 1963, Blackburn made Donoher the University's first full-time assistant coach.

Blackburn had been suffering from cancer for most of the 1963–64 season.  When the disease's effects became too debilitating for him to continue, Donoher took over as interim coach for the last three games of the season.   In March 1964, Blackburn died from cancer, and Donoher was formally named his successor.  However, Dayton credits the entire 1963–64 season to Blackburn.

Head coaching experience
Donoher enjoyed immediate success as a head coach, going 22–7 in his inaugural season and guiding the Flyers to a berth in the NCAA tournament, reaching the Sweet Sixteen.  Two years later, Donoher's Flyers defeated Western Kentucky University, the University of Tennessee, Virginia Tech, and the University of North Carolina en route to a national runner-up finish in the NCAA tournament.  During his tenure at Dayton, Donoher guided the Flyers to the NCAA tournament eight times, reaching the Sweet Sixteen five times, the Elite Eight twice, and the national final once.  Additionally, Dayton played in seven NIT post-season competitions under Donoher, winning the championship in 1968.  Donoher is Dayton's all-time winningest coach with a 437–275 record (.614), including a 20–16 post season record (.556).  Donoher-coached teams were noted for their discipline, tenacity, and sound fundamentals, frequently besting teams with greater athleticism.  Donoher served as an assistant to Head Coach Bobby Knight on the gold medal winning U.S. men's basketball team at the 1984 Summer Olympic Games.

Awards and recognition
Donoher has been inducted into the Toledo Area High School Hall of Fame, the Ohio High School Basketball Coaches Association Hall of Fame, and the University of Dayton Hall of Fame. On February 17, 2015 it was announced that Donoher had been selected for induction into the National Collegiate Basketball Hall of Fame.

In 1998, the University of Dayton named the new state of the art addition to the University of Dayton Arena after Donoher .

Donoher now lives in Dayton, Ohio and assists Pat Kreke in coaching at Bishop Fenwick High School in Middletown, Ohio, where his grandchildren, Kevin and Shannon, attended.

Head coaching record

See also
 List of NCAA Division I Men's Final Four appearances by coach

References

1932 births
Living people
American men's basketball coaches
American men's basketball players
Basketball coaches from Ohio
Basketball players from Dayton, Ohio
Dayton Flyers athletic directors
Dayton Flyers men's basketball coaches
Dayton Flyers men's basketball players
High school basketball coaches in Ohio
Indiana Hoosiers men's basketball coaches
Sportspeople from Toledo, Ohio